Phalonidia pellax is a species of moth of the family Tortricidae. It is found in Ecuador (Napo Province) and Brazil (Paraná).

References

Moths described in 1983
Phalonidia